Peter Snout is a mountain located in southwestern Newfoundland.

See also
 Mountain peaks of Canada

References

Peter Snout